Uchquduq District is a district of Navoiy Region in Uzbekistan. The capital lies at the city Uchquduq. The district consists of one city (Uchquduq), one urban-type settlement (Shalxar) and 5 rural communities.

References

Navoiy Region
Districts of Uzbekistan